The State House, located in Roseau, is the official residence of the President of Dominica. Previously it was used as the official residence of the colonial governors of Dominica.

The residence of the British governors of the island, and for a time the French, is situated on a low hill to the south of the commercial center of Roseau. Written accounts from the 1790s make mention of various plants and an avenue of trees in the grounds of Government House. The gardens here have suffered periodically from hurricanes. Many fine trees were destroyed by the main storms of the 20th century in 1916, 1930 and 1979.

Sir William Young was sworn in as governor of Dominica on 14 November 1770. He was responsible for among other things, directing the construction of the first Government House which he built near the Fort Young.

Once the official residence of the Queen's representative, the building has been the home to the President of Dominica since independence in 1978.

See also
Government Houses of the British Empire

References

Official residences in Dominica
Presidential residences
Government Houses of the British Empire and Commonwealth
Roseau
Dominica–United Kingdom relations